Max Walter Sebastian von Schlebrügge (born Max Walter Sebastian Holmström on 1 February 1977) is a Swedish former professional footballer who played as a center back. Starting off his professional career with IF Brommapojkarna in the late 1990s, he went on to represent Hammarby IF, R.S.C. Anderlecht, and Brøndby IF before retiring at IFK Österåker in 2021. A full international between 2003 and 2009, he has won 10 caps for the Sweden national team.

Club career 
Born in Solna, von Schlebrügge started off his career with AIK before moving to the United States to play collegiately for the Florida Atlantic Owls. After graduating from Florida Atlantic University, he returned to Sweden to play for Brommapojkarna. In 2002, he signed for the reigning Allsvenskan champions Hammarby IF. After more than 100 Allsvenskan appearances for Hammarby, von Schlebrügge signed with the Jupiler Pro League club Anderlecht in January 2007. He was signed by the Danish Superliga Brøndby IF in January 2008 from Anderlecht after having appeared in only eight league games for the Belgian club.

After four years in Denmark, von Schlebrügge returned to Hammarby in 2012. After two injury-plagued seasons, von Schlebrügge left Hammarby at the end of the 2013 Superettan season. In 2015, von Schlebrügge signed for the lower division team IFK Österåker.

International career 
Von Schlebrügge made his debut for the Sweden national team on 18 November 2003, in a friendly game against Egypt. He made his competitive debut for Sweden on 6 June 2007 as a substitute for Mikael Nilsson in the 56th minute of a UEFA Euro 2008 qualifier against Iceland which Sweden won 5–0. He won his 10th and last international cap in a friendly game against the United States on 24 January 2009.

Personal life 
Von Schlebrügge's last name comes from his paternal grandmother from Germany, who is an older half-sister of actress Uma Thurman's mother Nena von Schlebrügge, making Thurman his half-cousin once removed.

Career statistics

International

Honours 
IFK Österåker

 Division 4 Norra Stockholm: 2016, 2018
Individual

 All-Atlantic Sun Conference – Second Team: 1997

 Atlantic Sun Conference All-Tournament team: 1997

References

External links

1977 births
Allsvenskan players
Belgian Pro League players
Brøndby IF players
Danish Superliga players
Expatriate footballers in Belgium
Expatriate men's footballers in Denmark
Expatriate soccer players in the United States
Florida Atlantic Owls men's soccer players
Hammarby Fotboll players
IF Brommapojkarna players
Living people
R.S.C. Anderlecht players
Sweden international footballers
Swedish expatriate footballers
Swedish footballers
Swedish people of German descent
Association football defenders
Swedish expatriate sportspeople in the United States
Swedish expatriate sportspeople in Belgium
Swedish expatriate sportspeople in Denmark